Dondero is a surname. Notable people with the surname include:

 David Dondero (born 1969), singer-songwriter
 George Anthony Dondero (1883–1968), politician
 Len Dondero (1903–1999), baseballer

See also
 Dondero High School in Royal Oak, Michigan

Italian-language surnames